Phlogis kibalensis is a species of insect in the leafhopper family. P. kibalensis was described in 2022 by Alvin Helden, after being discovered in Kibale National Park, in western Uganda, on a student field trip from Anglia Ruskin University.

Description 
The male organs are partly leaf shaped. P. kibalensis feeds on plant sap and is preyed by beetles, birds, parasitic wasp, spiders and other invertebrates.

References 

Insects described in 2022
Cicadellidae
Insects of Uganda